Metarbela dialeuca is a moth in the family Cossidae. It is found in Kenya, Malawi and South Africa.

References

Natural History Museum Lepidoptera generic names catalog

Metarbelinae
Moths described in 1910